Chloroflexi is a temporary taxon name for:

 Chloroflexi (phylum), now named Chloroflexota
 Chloroflexi (class), now named Chloroflexia